Blepharidopterus is a genus of plant bugs in the family Miridae. There are about nine described species in Blepharidopterus.

Species
These nine species belong to the genus Blepharidopterus:
 Blepharidopterus angulatus (Fallén, 1807) (black-kneed capsid)
 Blepharidopterus chlorionis (Say, 1832) (honeylocust plant bug)
 Blepharidopterus diaphanus (Kirschbaum, 1856)
 Blepharidopterus dubius Wagner, 1954
 Blepharidopterus mesasiaticus Josifov, 1993
 Blepharidopterus provancheri (Burque, 1887)
 Blepharidopterus striatus Yasunaga, 1999
 Blepharidopterus ulmicola Kerzhner, 1977
 Blepharidopterus victoris Drapolyuk, 1981

References

Further reading

External links

 

Miridae genera
Articles created by Qbugbot
Orthotylini